Joey Tetarenko (born March 3, 1978) is a Canadian Métis former professional ice hockey player who played in the National Hockey League (NHL).

Playing career
Born in Prince Albert, Saskatchewan and growing up in St. Louis, Saskatchewan, Tetarenko was drafted by the Florida Panthers 82nd overall in the 1996 NHL Entry Draft. He played for Portland Winter Hawks while in high school. He made his National Hockey League debut for the Panthers during the 2000–01 NHL season and went on to play 69 games over three seasons before he was traded to the Ottawa Senators for Simon Lajeunesse. After appearing in only two games with Ottawa in 2003 he signed with the Carolina Hurricanes, spending much of his tenure with their American Hockey League affiliate the Lowell Lock Monsters.

Tetarenko signed with the Minnesota Wild in 2004, but never played for the team, instead spending three seasons in the AHL with the Houston Aeros. Tetarenko retired after the 2006–07 season with the Aeros.

Tetarenko was an assistant coach for the Dallas Oilers, and head coach of Bishop Lynch Varsity High School Hockey program in Dallas, Texas, in 2012–13, and now resides in Milton, Ontario. He now works for ProSharp, a skate blade company based in Sweden.

Career statistics

References

External links

1978 births
Living people
Beast of New Haven players
Binghamton Senators players
Canadian ice hockey right wingers
Carolina Hurricanes players
Florida Panthers draft picks
Florida Panthers players
Houston Aeros (1994–2013) players
Sportspeople from Prince Albert, Saskatchewan
Louisville Panthers players
Lowell Lock Monsters players
Ottawa Senators players
Portland Winterhawks players
San Antonio Rampage players
Ice hockey people from Saskatchewan
Métis sportspeople